Tales of the Drift is the second album from Australian hip-hop artists Hermitude.  It was released on 1 August 2005.

The album features Ozi Batla and Urthboy from The Herd on the track "Fallen Giants" and MC Blu on the track "Music from the Mind". Artwork designed by Kaho Cheung (aka Unkle Ho - The Herd) and was released on CD and as a double vinyl album.

Tales of the Drift was recorded and mixed by Hermitude and John Stuart at Sound Heaven Studios in Wentworth Falls.

The first single released was "Fallen Giants" which receiving significant airplay on Triple J, with the song being included on Triple J's compilation album Home & Hosed - Ripe & Ready.

Track listing 
All tracks written by Hermitude.
 "You Got Soul" - 1:31
 "Tapedeck Sound" - 6:05
 "Can’t Stop" - 5:37
 "Music From The Mind" - 3:15
 "Nightfall's Messenger" - 4:36
 "Plunge" - 1:50
 "Observation Deck" - 5:06
 "Zacktor" - 5:08
 "Galactic Cadillac" - 3:52
 "Fallen Giants" - 4:18
 "Dub's Theme" - 4:08
 "Madness in G Minor" - 4:22
 "Ruffwon" - 5:37
 "The Drift" - 4:31
 "Mystical Herm's" - 4:02

References

External links
 Herald Sun Hits - 'Tales of the Drifts'

2005 albums
Hermitude albums